Fairview is an inner coastal suburb of Dublin in Ireland, in the jurisdiction of Dublin City Council and in the city's D03 postal district. Part of the area forms Fairview Park, a recreational amenity laid out on land reclaimed from the sea.

Location
Modern day Fairview is a popular inner suburb of Dublin that stretches north east from the River Tolka to Clontarf Road DART Station along Fairview Park to the south, and along the redbrick Victorian part of Philipsburgh Avenue to the north. It is bounded by Marino which was developed in 1924 in the area of Fairview on former estate lands of Lord Charlemont. The grounds of St. Vincent's Hospital, Fairview and Drumcondra are to the west.

Fairview is reached on a main road artery from Dublin city via North Strand, which continues on as the Malahide, Howth and Clontarf Roads. It is served by the Clontarf Road DART station. The area can also be reached by way of several Dublin Bus routes from the city centre, including 14, 15, 27/ABNX, 29A/N, 31/B, 32/ABX, 42/N, 43, 123, 130 and the "H" bus corridor. It will include the segregated cycle path that goes from the Amiens Street to Sutton, which began construction in 2022.

Neighbouring districts include Marino to the north, North Strand and Ballybough to the west, East Wall to the southwest, and Clontarf to the east.

Name

Until the end of the 18th century, the area was known as Ballybough, with many street signs still giving the Irish name of the area as Baile Bocht. The parish of Fairview was created in 1879, when it was separated from Clontarf, reputedly named for the local church, Our Lady of Fair View dedicated to Our Lady of Pulchro Aspectu vulgo Fairview in 1819. Administratively, Fairview and Marino were part of the old townland of Clonturk, which also included Drumcondra.

History
Along with large areas of Ballybough, Dorset Street, Clonliffe Road, and Lower Drumcondra, much of Fairview was part of the farmland owned by St Mary's Abbey in the 14th century. During the dissolution of the monasteries, St Mary's was given to Earl of Desmond and the tithes of the area then known as Ballybough were given to William Howth. The area was later owned by a proprietor, John Bathe. The Bathe family held large areas of land for a long period, including Drumcondra Castle, until the end of the reign of Charles I, with Walter Peppard leasing Ballybough and the area now known as Fairview. After the 1641 Rebellion and the following wars, the population of Fairview remained low.

Around 1718, one of Dublin's earliest Jewish communities was established in the area, then known as Annadale. The communities originated in Portugal and Spain to Dublin during the Cromwellian era due to his tolerance of Jews. They were escaping the Spanish Inquisition and initially settled near Crane Lane in Dublin city. Their village at Annadale was connected to Fairview by Ellis's Lane, which later became Philipsburgh Avenue  from the mid-1700s. The community left the area, moving to the south side of the city, in the late 1800s and early 1900s. On Fairview Strand, near Luke Kelly bridge, is Dublin's oldest Jewish Cemetery, Ballybough Cemetery. The graveyard was built in 1718 on land leased on a peppercorn rent from Chichester Phillips, but it was a different, prominent Jew also named Philips for whom Philipsburgh Avenue is most likely named. The mortuary chapel added in 1857 and contains more than 200 graves. The last burial there was in 1958. Before the extension of Philipsburg Avenue for the Marino housing estate, the northern end was a lane called Sally Park. In the mid-1800s it is reputed there was a Baptist chapel and congregation on Philipsburgh Avenue.

The Richmond Road connects Fairview with Drumcondra on the northern side of the River Tolka and was laid out to provide access to Drumcondra Castle. The thoroughfare was a lane way until reputedly a jeweller and merchant, Francis Jacob Grose, built a house called Richmond House in the mid-1700s, from which the road is thought to take its name. His house was on the site now occupied by St. Vincent's Hospital. Kingston suggests that he named his house for Richmond, London, and that his building of his house in this area led to it becoming more fashionable with the merchant class. Grose's son was the antiquarian, Francis Grose, who is buried at Drumcondra Church. Richmond House was bought by the Daughters of Charity and incorporated into St Vincent's. Kingston reports that reputedly some Huguenots who sought refuge in Dublin built houses along the Richmond Road.

From the end of the 1700s, industries were established in the area, in particular the manufacture of flint glass. One factory was established by Philip Roche. A factory near Ballybough Bridge made glass for Dublin Castle, and Chebsey's glass house produced a chandelier for the Irish Houses of Parliament with 1233 glass pieces. The density of such factories resulted in Factory Lane, which is now Esmonde Avenue. During the reign of James II, the Fairview area was owned by Chicester Phillips and Sir John Eccles. Due to the extensive tidal areas which encompassed the area up the Fairview Strand at this time, there were not many houses built in the area, with the Clontarf strand much more popular for houses and recreation. After the closure of the glass factories, the Coghills of Drumcondra established a green to bleach linen on the Richmond Road which was later replaced with a factory for printing linen. This factory was admired by Mary Delany. Fairview's population was still small, but some notable residents began to move to the area including Joseph Dioderice, the maternal grandfather of Thomas Elrington, in 1748. In 1787 Fairview was described as containing "very neat and elegant houses". 

Fairview began to grow after the building of Annesley Bridge in 1797 opened up easy access to the land. Until 1797 there had been no crossing of the River Tolka below Ballybough Bridge. Fairview Strand was formally known as Owen Roe Terrace and Philipsburgh Strand. The boundary of Fairview and the area now known as Marino, but historically part of Donnycarney, was delineated by the walls of the demesne of Marino House along Fairview Strand. The house and most of its surrounds are now demolished, apart from the Casino at Marino and the original Georgian entrance gates which have been relocated to Griffith Avenue..

Annadale House was located in an estate that now comprises Melrose Avenue, Lomond Avenue, Waverly Avenue, and Inverness Road. Cadogan and Addison Roads were built in the mid-1800s, and were named for Dublin peers. A number of Georgian houses have since be demolished including Mulberry Lodge, Pennyville, and Woodlands. A Carmelite monastery once stood on Fairview Avenue, on the site of Fairview cinema. Pennyville was a small estate at the end of Fairview Avenue which was later known as Croydon Park. Bushfield House has survived, and stands on Philipsburgh Avenue. From the 1840s, houses were built on Richmond Avenue, which was seen as a fashionable area. The area which is now Merville Avenue was known as the Big Gun after a local tavern. When Fairview Church was opened in 1855 there were 20 houses on Fairview Strand, two on Windsor Avenue, and 41 houses on Philipsburgh Avenue. The horse trams and later the railway trams which crossed over Anneseley Bridge and ran up to Clontarf increased the accessibility of Fairview.

From 1832 to 1909, 89 Fairview Strand was a Royal Irish Constabulary Barracks and the now demolished Erlington House was home to Thomas Erlington, and later the opera singer Josephine O'Brien. A burial area for those who died by suicide is thought to have been located at the boundary of Fairview and Ballybough, at the corner of Clonliffe Avenue and the Ballybough Road, and is cited as one of the inspirations for Bram Stoker's Dracula.

Amenities

The main commercial areas are Fairview, a busy road alongside Fairview Park, and Fairview Strand, a narrower commercial and residential strip running from Edge's Corner around to Luke Kelly Bridge.

St Vincent's Hospital was founded by the Daughters of Charity in 1857. Located on the Richmond Road, it provides psychiatric services for the northeast quadrant of Dublin city.

Parks

Fairview Park has playing fields, a children's playground and tree-lined walks. Originally a tidal mud flat which was used for land fill in the early 1900s, the park was developed in the late 1920s and bye laws were formally adopted by Dublin Corporation in 1934. The Rover Tolka runs right past the park, Clontarf Road DART station is located near the park, and across the railway line there is a 400-metre athletics track and a Comhaltas Ceoltóirí Éireann hall.

A memorial statue of Seán Russell was unveiled by Cumann Uaigheann Na Laochra Gael, in Fairview Park, September 1951. A new statue of him was erected in May 2009. The park also features a sculpture by Joe Moran, Family Unit 1. Alongside a number of other sites, Fairview Park was considered as a location for the Garden of Remembrance in the early 1970s.

On 19 March 1983, prior to the first Dublin Pride parade, a march was held from Liberty Hall to Fairview Park. This was in response to the murder of Declan Flynn in the park, and the resulting trial.

Fairview Park was built on reclaimed land. It was temporarily reduced in size during the 2000s, due to the development of the Dublin Port Tunnel, the entrance to which is approximately a kilometre beyond the park perimeter. The park has now been restored. It contains two small playgrounds and a larger playground which includes a skate park. The park also contained a band stand, which was removed during the construction of the Port Tunnel.

The park contains several association football pitches. Both Sheriff Y.C. and Belvedere play home games in the park.

A smaller park, Bram Stoker Park, is located in front of the Georgian terrace of Marino Crescent; both the park and the street are in a pocket of neighbouring Clontarf. Stoker was born in number 15 Marino Crescent.

Public services
A Garda Síochána station is located in nearby Clontarf and a Dublin Fire Brigade and ambulance station is located just across the Tolka, at Annesley Bridge. A credit union is located on Fairview Strand, and a Post Office on Marino Mart. Dublin City Libraries have a branch on the main road in Fairview.

Education

Past pupils of St. Joseph's Secondary C.B.S., Fairview include former Taoiseach, Charles Haughey. The secondary school Marino College is in nearby Marino. St. Marys national school for girls is close to Richmond Road.

Politics
Fairview is in the administrative area of Dublin City Council.  It lies in the Dublin North Central Dáil constituency and the Clontarf Local Electoral Area for city council elections. It is served by the Fairview Residents Association.

Religion
Fairview is a parish in the Fingal South East deanery of the Roman Catholic Archdiocese of Dublin. It is served by the Church of Visitation of the Blessed Virgin Mary. The construction of this church began in 1853, and it was opened on 15 January 1855. Fairview Hall is a Gospel Hall at 13 Annesley Bridge Road, and is part of the Gospel Hall Brethren local assembly.

Notable people
Cathal Brugha, revolutionary and politician, born at 13 Richmond Avenue.
Brendan Cauldwell, actor.
Éamonn Ceannt, one of the seven signatories of the Proclamation of the Irish Republic, lived at 23 Fairview Avenue.
Kathleen and Tom Clarke, lived at 31 Richmond Avenue.
Sean Connolly, captain in the Irish Citizen Army and Abbey Theatre actor, lived at 108 Philipsburgh Avenue.
Ned Daly, Irish revolutionary.
Henry Loftus, 1st Earl of Ely
Larry Gogan, broadcaster.
Cathal Goulding, Irish republican, lived at 15 Cadogan Road.
Rosie Hackett, actively involved in the trade union movement, 1913 Lockout and 1916 Rising, lived in Fairview.
Frank Henderson, captain in the Irish Volunteers.
George Henry Kinahan, geologist, lived at Woodlands, Philipsburgh Avenue.
Charles Lever, writer, lived on Philipsburgh Avenue.
Charles Lucas, the patriot physician, lived at Pennyville.
James Joyce, lived at a number of addresses in Fairview between 1896 and 1901.
Liam Mellows and Barney Mellows, Irish revolutionaries whose childhood home was 10 Annadale Avenue.
Thomas McDonagh, one of the seven signatories of the Proclamation of the Irish Republic, lived at Woodlands, Philipsburgh Avenue. 
Seán Óg Ó Ceallacháin, broadcaster and former Gaelic footballer and hurler.
Fred O'Donovan, theatre and radio producer.
Maureen Potter, actress, singer and performer, grew up on St. Joseph's Terrace, off Philipsburgh Avenue.
Maureen Toal, stage and television actress.

References

Sources

 

Towns and villages in Dublin (city)